Lawless Empire is a 1945 American Western film directed by Vernon Keays and written by Bennett Cohen. The film stars Charles Starrett, Tex Harding, Dub Taylor, Mildred Law and Bob Wills. The film was released on November 15, 1945, by Columbia Pictures.

Plot
In the lawless town of Dusty Gulch, the Durango Kid comes to the aid of Reverend Harding in his fight against Blaze Howard and his henchman. When Durango foils all of Blaze’s plans, Blaze’s boss Doc Weston realizes that it's Cannonball who's tipping off Durango. Weston then lets Cannonball overhear false information that will send Durango into a fatal trap.

Cast          
Charles Starrett as Steve Ranson / The Durango Kid
Tex Harding as Reverend Tex Harding
Dub Taylor as Cannonball
Mildred Law as Vicky Harding
Bob Wills as Bob Wills
Johnny Walsh as Marty Foster
John Calvert as Blaze Howard
Ethan Laidlaw as Duke Flinders
Forrest Taylor as Doc Weston
Jack Rockwell as Jed Stevens
George Chesebro as Lenny
Boyd Stockman as Skids
Lloyd Ingraham as Mr. Murphy
Jessie Arnold as Mrs. Murphy
Tom Chatterton as Sam Enders

References

External links
 

1945 films
American Western (genre) films
1945 Western (genre) films
Columbia Pictures films
American black-and-white films
Films directed by Vernon Keays
1940s English-language films
1940s American films